Khamgaon is the municipal council in Buldhana district, Maharashtra

Results

Maharashtra
Buldhana district
2016 elections in India